Michael Joseph Carbonaro (born April 28, 1976) is an American actor, magician, and improv artist.

Early life
Born and raised in Oakdale, New York, on Long Island, the younger of two sons of an electrician father and a nurse mother, he attended Connetquot High School in Bohemia, New York. He began performing magic professionally while growing up, earning his college tuition while still in his teens. He holds a bachelor's degree in drama from the Tisch School of the Arts at NYU.

Career 
He is known for his hidden-camera "Magic Clerk" segments on The Tonight Show, in which he tricks unsuspecting customers at a convenience store. This led to a television series with a similar premise, The Carbonaro Effect, which premiered on TruTV on May 15, 2014, following a preview episode on April 1, 2014.

In 2004, he was featured on Chappelle's Show on Comedy Central. Following that, Carbonaro played Andy Wilson in the 2006 comedy Another Gay Movie. For his work, he won the Outfest "Best Actor in a Feature Film" award. Carbonaro has also appeared on All My Children (2006), The Guiding Light (2006), and Law & Order: Special Victims Unit (2007).

Personal life
Carbonaro is gay. He has been married to actor Peter Stickles since 2014.

Filmography

Film

Television

References

External links 
 Archived from the original on December 17, 2014.

1976 births
Living people
20th-century American male actors
21st-century American male actors
American male film actors
American male television actors
American magicians
LGBT magicians
American gay actors
LGBT people from New York (state)
Tisch School of the Arts alumni
Academy of Magical Arts Magician of the Year winners